Großnaundorf is a municipality in the district of Bautzen, in Saxony, Germany.

References 

Populated places in Bautzen (district)